Are You Listening? is a 1932 American pre-Code drama film directed by Harry Beaumont and starring William Haines, Madge Evans and Anita Page.

Plot
Radio writer Bill Grimes is in love with radio actress Laura O' Neill, and they enjoy harmless social activities together like roller-skating. But Bill is bitterly married to Alice, who dislikes him as much as he does her but they are unable to separate because, in the Depression, they can't afford separate domiciles. Alice demands that Bill stay home for their third wedding anniversary celebration so as not to humiliate her in front of another couple she's invited; at Laura's suggestion, Bill tries to soften her by a gift of stockings, but she criticizes them and the evening is wretched for him. He had to break a theater date with Laura to be there, and when he finally gets away to visit her she decides this can't work and breaks up with him. Laura lives with her sister Sally, who is practiced in dating rich men without compromising herself. Their younger, naive sister Honey comes to town avid to go out on double dates with Sally, but does not master the technique of furtively dumping her liquor, gets sloppy drunk and Sally must rescue her. Honey thinks a clubman means to marry her, but when he shows up for a lunch date he scoffs at the idea, says all men lie like that, and just wants to keep dating her even though he's engaged. She is consoled by her sisters and finds love with a nice guy at the station whose intentions are honourable. There is backstage comedy about an inept sound-effects man and a series of great love stories the sponsor, a bathtub magnate, dislikes because they're not about plumbing. Late in the story, Bill moves out into a hotel; he has lost his job because he's too depressed to write comedy, and can't send the money to Alice that he promised. She comes to confront him in his hotel room, they quarrel, and when he gives her a small, exasperated push without looking she falls, hits her head and dies. Bill thinks of calling the police, but instead panics and runs; he goes to say goodbye to Laura, and she decides to run with him. The police discover the body (offstage) very quickly, and the radio station manager decides to make a sensational story out of tracking down the "vicious murderer" and his "paramour". Bill and Laura get as far as Miami, but a gas station attendant has recognized them from the anodyne radio description and called the police, so that a newspaper editor they go to for help locks them in his office and calls the radio station. Bill thinks he is talking to a sympathetic colleague who will get him a lawyer, but he really puts the phone call with Bill on the air and spins it to say Bill confessed (he didn't). This apparently does no harm at Bill's trial, because we next find that he was just convicted of manslaughter. Laura meets him at the station on his way to prison and they cheer each other up with the reflection that his sentence is only three years, it could be reduced for good behaviour, and "maybe the Depression will be over by then."

Cast
 William Haines as Bill Grimes
 Madge Evans as Laura O'Neil
 Anita Page as Sally O'Neil
 Karen Morley as Alice Grimes
 Neil Hamilton as Jack Clayton
 Wallace Ford as Larry Barnes
 Jean Hersholt as George Wagner
 Joan Marsh as Honey O'Neil
 John Miljan as Ted Russell
 Murray Kinnell as Carson
 Ethel Griffies as Mrs Peters
 Hattie McDaniel as Singer
 Rolfe Sedan as Hotel Manager
 Louise Carter as Mrs O'Neil
 Charles Coleman as Butler
 Charley Grapewin as Pierce
 Frank Whitlock as Radio Announcer
 Herman Bing as Actor

Production
Are You Listening? was William Haines' final film for Metro-Goldwyn-Mayer. The film was an attempt by the studio to revamp Bill's character. The film turned a small profit, although not as impressive as, New Adventures of Get Rich Quick Wallingford, (his previous film), and nowhere near the Haines grosses of old.

References

External links
 
 
 
 

1932 films
1932 crime drama films
American black-and-white films
American crime drama films
Films about radio people
Films directed by Harry Beaumont
Metro-Goldwyn-Mayer films
1930s English-language films
1930s American films